The checker-throated stipplethroat (Epinecrophylla fulviventris), also called fulvous-bellied antwren or checker-throated antwren, is a small passerine bird in the antbird family. It has traditionally been placed in the genus Myrmotherula, but is, together with other members of the so-called "stipple-throated group", now placed in the new genus Epinecrophylla. This is supported by molecular work, behavior, voice and morphology. Now treated as monotypic, it includes the former subspecies E. f. costaricensis and E. f. salmoni.

It is a resident breeder in tropical Central and South America from southeastern Honduras to western Ecuador. In Central America, it occurs in the Caribbean lowlands and foothills up to 700 m altitude.

The checker-throated stipplethroat is typically 10 cm long and weighs 10.5 g. Both sexes have olive-brown upperparts, paler buff-brown underparts, and blackish wings with buff wingbars. The adult male has a blackish throat, heavily spotted with white, a greyish wash to the breast, and dusky sides to the head. The adult female has a buff throat and buff central breast. Young birds are brighter and more cinnamon than the adults, with less distinct wingbars and pale streaking on the under parts. This species has a thin cheep call, and the song is a loud .

The checker-throated stipplethroat is normally found as pairs or small groups, but often forms the core of a  mixed-species feeding flock. It feeds on the eggs, larvae and adults of insects and spiders, taken from leaf litter, epiphyte bases and vine tangles in low vegetation or on the ground. This is a common bird in the understory of wet forest and in adjacent tall second growth.  The female lays two lilac or red-brown spotted white eggs, which are incubated by both sexes, in a 15 cm deep pouch nest constructed from plant fibres and dead leaves. The nest is suspended from the last fork of a thin twig less than 2 m up. The male and female parents both feed the chicks. At territorial boundaries, males will perch 30 cm apart with lowered heads and puffed-out plumage and sway in opposite directions.

References

Irestedt, Martin ; Fjeldså, Jon; Nylander, Johan A. A. & Ericson, Per G. P. (2004): Phylogenetic relationships of typical antbirds (Thamnophilidae) and test of incongruence based on Bayes factors. BMC Evol. Biol. 4: 23.  Supplementary information 
 Isler, M., D. Lacerda, P. Isler, S. Hackett, K. Rosenberg, and R. Brumfield (2006). Epinecrophylla, a new genus of antwrens (Aves: Passeriformes: Thamnophilidae). Proceedings of the Biological Society of Washington 119(4): 522–527.
Stiles, F. Gary & Skutch, Alexander Frank (1989): A guide to the birds of Costa Rica. Comistock, Ithaca.

Further reading

checker-throated stipplethroat
Birds of Nicaragua
Birds of Costa Rica
Birds of Panama
Birds of Colombia
Birds of Ecuador
checker-throated stipplethroat
checker-throated stipplethroat